Ali Sara may refer to:
 Ali Sara, Fuman
 Ali Sara, Rasht
 Ali Sara, Shaft
 Ali Sara, Talesh